Hewitt is an unincorporated community located within West Milford Township in Passaic County, New Jersey, United States. The area is served as United States Postal Service ZIP Code 07421. It is named for Abram Hewitt.

Demographics

As of the 2010 United States Census, the population for ZIP Code Tabulation Area 07421 was 7,439.

Sites of interest
Long Pond Ironworks State Park
Long Pond Ironworks

References

External links
The West Milford Messenger, local area newspaper

West Milford, New Jersey
Unincorporated communities in Passaic County, New Jersey
Unincorporated communities in New Jersey